National 

Auchengaich Reservoir was created in 1942 through the construction of an earthfill dam built by the military to supply water to Helensburgh and the Gareloch during World War II.

See also
 List of reservoirs and dams in the United Kingdom

Sources

"Argyll and Bute Council Reservoirs Act 1975 Public Register"

Reservoirs in Argyll and Bute